Demas Hubbard Jr. (January 17, 1806 – September 2, 1873) was a U.S. Representative from New York.

Born in Winfield, New York, Hubbard attended the public schools and became a farmer.  In 1829 he was elected Overseer of Highways for the Village of Smyrna.  From 1831 to 1832 he was Smyrna's Village Clerk.  He studied law.  He was admitted to the bar and commenced practice in Smyrna, New York, in 1835.

A Whig at the start of his career, Hubbard served as a member of the New York State Assembly from 1838 to 1840.  He became a Republican when the party was organized in the 1850s.  He was Smyrna's Town Supervisor from 1859 to 1864, and also served as Chairman of the Chenango County Board of Supervisors.  From 1862 to 1863 he served as President of the Village of Smyrna.

Hubbard was elected as a Republican to the 39th Congress (March 4, 1865 – March 3, 1867).  He was not a candidate for renomination in 1866 and returned to practicing law.

He died in Smyrna on September 2, 1873, and was interred in Smyrna East Cemetery.

Sources

1806 births
1873 deaths
People from Winfield (town), New York
New York (state) lawyers
Town supervisors in New York (state)
County legislators in New York (state)
Republican Party members of the New York State Assembly
Burials in New York (state)
Republican Party members of the United States House of Representatives from New York (state)
19th-century American politicians
19th-century American lawyers